Cratloe GAA is a Gaelic Athletic Association club located in the village of Cratloe, County Clare, Ireland.  The club deals with both Gaelic football and hurling and basketball. The club competes in Clare GAA competitions.

In November 2013, Cratloe won their first ever Clare Senior Football Championship title, defeating Doonbeg by 0-10 to 0-7.
They reached the 2013 Munster Senior Club Football Championship final on 1 December, but were defeated 0-13 to 0-12 by Dr Crokes.

In 2014, Cratloe won the Clare Senior Hurling championship on 5th October and the Clare Senior Football Championship seven days later. This was the first time that a Clare club had lifted both senior club trophies on the field of play since Ennis Dalcassians completed  'The Double' in 1929.

Major honours

Hurling
 Munster Senior Club Hurling Championship Runners-Up: 2014
 Clare Senior Hurling Championship (2): 2009, 2014
 Clare Intermediate Hurling Championship (4): 1937, 1943, 1970, 1994
 Clare Junior A Hurling Championship (4): 1935, 1964, 1976, 2013
 Clare Under-21 A Hurling Championship (1): 1992

Gaelic football
 Munster Senior Club Football Championship Runners-Up: 2013
 Clare Senior Football Championship (2): 2013, 2014
 Munster Intermediate Club Football Championship Runners-Up: 2009
 Clare Intermediate Football Championship (2): 2004, 2009
 Clare Junior A Football Championship (1): 2002
 Clare Football League Div.3 (1): 2022
 Clare Under-21 A Football Championship (2): 2009, 2011

Notable players
Podge Collins (son of Colm)
Conor Ryan
Conor McGrath
Cathal McInerney
Liam Markham
John Galvin
Billy Sheehan

References

External links
Clare GAA site
Official Cratloe GAA Club website

Gaelic games clubs in County Clare
Hurling clubs in County Clare
Gaelic football clubs in County Clare